The Most Distinguished Order of Paduka Seri Laila Jasa, also translated as The Most Distinguished Order of Merit of Brunei, is an order of Brunei. It was established in February 1964 by Sultan Omar Ali Saifuddien III.

The order consists of three classes:

Recipients

First Class 

 Unknown – Kemaluddin Al-Haj – Speaker of Legislative Council
 Unknown – Marianne E. Lloyd-Dolbey – Personal Secretary to Sultan Omar Ali Saifuddien III

Second Class 

 Unknown – Major General Husin – Commander of the Royal Brunei Armed Forces
 Unknown – Besar Metassan – Nobility
 Unknown – Abu Bakar Apong – Minister of Home Affairs
 1983 – Abdul Aziz Juned – State Mufti
 2010 – Rodman R. Bundy – Partner in Eversheds litigation
 2018 – James Kerr Findlay – Commissioner of the Supreme Court

Third Class 
 Unknown – Abdul Rahman – Speaker of Legislative Council

References 

Orders, decorations, and medals of Brunei
Awards established in 1964
1964 establishments in Brunei